This is the list of cathedrals in South Africa sorted by denomination.

Anglican
Anglican cathedrals in South Africa:

 Cathedral Church of St George the Martyr in Cape Town
 Cathedral of St Andrew and St Michael in Bloemfontein 
 Cathedral of St Mark in George
 St. Michael and St. George Cathedral in Grahamstown 
 Cathedral of St Dunstan in Benoni 
 Cathedral of St Mary The Virgin in Johannesburg 
 Cathedral Church of St Cyprian the Martyr in Kimberley 
 St. John the Evangelist Cathedral in Mthatha 
 Cathedral of the Holy Nativity, Pietermaritzburg 
 Cathedral Church of St Mary the Virgin in Port Elizabeth 
 Cathedral of St Alban the Martyr in Pretoria 
 Cathedral Of St Michael And All Angels in Eshowe
 Christ Church Cathedral in Polokwane

Roman Catholic 
Cathedrals of the Roman Catholic Church in South Africa:
 Sacred Heart Cathedral in Aliwal North
 Cathedral of the Immaculate Heart of Mary in Bethlehem
 Sacred Heart Cathedral in Bloemfontein
 Cathedral of St. Mary of the Flight into Egypt in Cape Town
 Cathedral of Our Lady of the Assumption in De Aar
 Cathedral of St. Francis of Assisi in Dundee
 Emmanuel Cathedral in Durban
 Cathedral of St. Therese of the Little Flower in Eshowe
 Cathedral of the Good Shepherd and Our Lady of Sorrows in Hlabisa
 Cathedral of Christ The King, Johannesburg
 Cathedral of the Immaculate Conception in Pella
 Co-Cathedral of St. Augustine in Upington
 St. Mary’s Cathedral in Kimberley
 Cathedral of Christ the Redeemer in Klerksdorp
 St. Patrick’s Cathedral in Kokstad
 St. Patrick’s Cathedral in Kroonstad
 St. Joseph’s Cathedral in Mariannhill
 Cathedral of Our Lady Assumed into Heaven in Umtata
 St. Saviour’s Cathedral in Oudtshoorn
 Cathedral of the Sacred Heart in Polokwane
 Cathedral of St. Augustine in Port Elizabeth
 Sacred Heart Cathedral in Pretoria
 Cathedral of Christ the King in Queenstown
 Cathedral of St. Alphonsus Maria de Liguori in Boshoek
 Cathedral of Our Lady of the Sacred Heart and St. Joseph in Mooketse
 Cathedral of Our Lady of Lourdes in Harding
 Christ the King Cathedral in Witbank

Greek Orthodox
 The Agios Georgios Cathedral (Cathedral of St. George) in Woodstock, Cape Town, is the seat of the Greek Orthodox Archbishopric of Good Hope

See also
List of cathedrals

References

Churches in South Africa
Lists of cathedrals
Cathedrals
Cathedrals